Hajji Sufi (also Romanized as Ḩājjī Şūfī) is a village in Zangebar Rural District, in the Central District of Poldasht County, West Azerbaijan Province, Iran. At the 2006 census, its population was 87, in 22 families.

References 

Populated places in Poldasht County